The 2007–08 Biathlon World Cup was a multi-race tournament over a season of biathlon, organised by the International Biathlon Union. The season started 28 November 2007 and ended 16 March 2008.

This article contains the top ten result listings and concise summary comments for each of the season's twenty-seven individual races and five relays for both genders, arranged by World Cup meet 1 through 9 (denoted WC 1–9), accompanied by the top ten Total Cup rankings after each of the meets plus the 2008 World Championships (held between WC 6 and 7, and in the usual way counted as a World Cup meet towards the accumulated scores).

 For detailed tables of the development of accumulated scores and related rankings in the Total, Individual, Sprint, Pursuit, Mass start, Relay, and Nation Cups, see 2007–08 Biathlon World Cup statistics.
 For a list of the Total and Relay World Cup winners and runners-up of all World Cup seasons since 1977–78, see the Biathlon World Cup article.

Scores and leader bibs 

 For the eighth successive season, the race victory gives 50 points, a 2nd place gives 46 pts, a 3rd place 43 pts, a 4th place 40 pts, a fifth place 37 pts, a 6th place 34 pts, then further decreasing by two pts down to the 15th place (16 pts), then linearly decreasing by one point down to the 30th place (see the Place/Points table on the page's upper right). Equal placings, i.e. same-time finishes (ties) give an equal number of points.
 The sum of all WC points of the season, minus the score from a predetermined number of events (say, 3) give the biathlete's accumulated WC score (naturally, the races chosen to be eliminated from the total will be those with the lowest scores). Biathletes with an equal number of accumulated points are ranked by number of victories, 2nd places, 3rd places, and so on, in practice reducing the possibility of ties to just about nil.
 In addition to the Total WC score as described above, the points from races in each separate single-biathlete format—Individual, Sprint, Pursuit, and Mass start—accumulate toward separate scores with associated "sub-Cups" to be won. See the main Biathlon article for a detailed description of the race formats.
 In any given race, the biathlete with the highest accumulated Total WC score before the race wears a yellow number bib. The leader of the specific race format wears a red bib. If the same biathlete leads both the Total and the specific format's World Cup, a combined yellow-and-red bib is worn. In the first races of the season, the winners of the previous season's Cups wear the associated bibs.
 There are also two multi-biathlete Cups to be won, namely the Relay and Nation Cups. The scores of the Relay races are awarded to each nation's team in the same manner as in the single-biathlete Cups. No leader bibs are worn during the Relays. For the Nation Cup, the combined scores of the three best biathletes from each nation in the Individual and Sprint races, as well as the Relay scores, are accumulated. The Nation Cup points scale is different from the World Cup points scale; each place from 1st through 30th scores 100 more points than in the World Cup, and from 31st down to 130th points are awarded on a scale from 100 to 1.

Calendar
Below is the IBU World Cup calendar for the 2007–08 season.

Medal table

World Cup podiums

Men

Women

Men's team

Women's team

Mixed

Standings: Men

Overall 

Final standings after 26 races.

Individual 

Final standings after 3 races.

Sprint 

Final standings after 10 races.

Pursuit 

Final standings after 8 races.

Mass start 

Final standings after 5 races.

Relay 

Final standings after 5 races.

Nation 

Final standings after 18 races.

Standings: Women

Overall 

Final standings after 26 races.

Individual 

Final standings after 3 races.

Sprint 

Final standings after 10 races.

Pursuit 

Final standings after 8 races.

Mass start 

Final standings after 5 races.

Relay 

Final standings after 5 races.

Nation 

Final standings after 18 races.

Achievements
First World Cup career victory
, 26, in her 6th season — the WC 1 Pursuit in Kontiolahti; first podium was 2004–05 Sprint in Antholz-Anterselva
 31, in his 6th season — the WC 2 Sprint in Hochfilzen; first podium was 2006–07 Sprint  in Östersund
, 22, in his 3rd season — the WC 3 Individual in Pokljuka; first podium was 2006–07 Sprint in Ruhpolding
, 24, in her 3rd season — the WC 3 Individual in Pokljuka; first podium was 2006–07 Sprint in Lahti
, 32, in her 2nd season — the WC 5 Sprint in  Ruhpolding; also her first individual podium
,  21, in her 2nd season — the WC 5 Sprint in  Ruhpolding; first podium was 2007–08  in the WC 4 Sprint in Oberhof
, 25, in her 3rd season — the WC 5 Pursuit in  Ruhpolding; also her first individual podium
, 29, in his 7th season — the WC 6 Pursuit in  Antholz-Anterselva; first podium was 2004–05 Sprint in Torino - Cesana San Sicario
, 21, in her 2nd season — the WC 8 Pursuit in  Khanty-Mansiysk ; first podium was 2006–07  Pursuit in Lahti
, 25, in his 7th season — the WC 9 Mass Start in Holmenkollen ; first podium was 2006–07  Sprint in  Antholz-Anterselva

First World Cup podium
,  31, in his 6th season — no. 3 in the WC 1 Sprint in Kontiolahti
,  26, in his 5th season — no. 3 in the WC 2 Pursuit in Hochfilzen
,  23, in his 4th season — no. 3 in the WC 3 Individual in Pokljuka
,  24, in her 3rd season — no. 2 in the WC 3 Sprint in Pokljuka
,  35, in her 6th season — no. 2 in the WC 4 Mass Start in Oberhof
,  28, in his 2nd season — no. 3 in the World Championships 2008 Individual in Östersund
, 30, in his 7th season — no. 3 in the WC 7 Sprint in Pyeongchang

Victory in this World Cup (all-time number of victories in parentheses)

Men
 , 7 (81) first places
 , 6 (6) first places
 , 4 (9) first places
 , 2 (4) first places
 , 2 (3) first places
 , 1 (3) first places
 , 1 (2) first places
 , 1 (1) first place
 , 1 (1) first place
 , 1 (1) first place

Women
  4 (20) first places
 , 4 (14)  first places
 , 4 (11) first places
 , 3 (3) first places
 , 2 (18) first places
 , 2 (13) first places
 , 2 (2) first places
 , 2 (2) first places
 , 2 (2) first places
 , 1 (1) first place
 , 1 (1) first place

Retirements
Following notable biathletes retired after the 2007–08 season:

References and notes

 
World Cup
World Cup
Biathlon World Cup